The Dodgers–Padres rivalry is a Major League Baseball (MLB) National League divisional rivalry played between the Los Angeles Dodgers and the San Diego Padres. The Dodgers and Padres are both members of the National League (NL) West division. Los Angeles and San Diego are the two biggest cities in Southern California and lie approximately 130 miles apart along Interstate 5.

Background
The rise of Southern California as a major region of the United States brought about a significant economic rivalry between neighboring Los Angeles and San Diego. Through the years, San Diego proved to be an unstable home to its sports franchises as the Chargers and Clippers would ultimately relocate to Los Angeles at various points in time. The San Diego Padres and Los Angeles Dodgers have been rivals ever since the Padres joined the National League West Division. The Dodgers have traditionally been the much better team in this rivalry, though most San Diego fans particularly harbor most of their animosity towards LA. As of recent times, both the Dodgers and Padres had bolstered their rosters in their respective push for a playoff run. The Dodgers culminated in a World Series championship in 2020 on top of 4 consecutive appearances in the NLCS, while the Padres managed an appearance in the 2020 NLDS, though they would get swept by the Dodgers on Los Angeles' championship run. Both stadiums are accessible via Amtrak as The Pacific Surfliner connects the two cities given Petco Park's proximity to San Diego Station and Dodger Stadium's shuttle to and from LA Union Station.

As of 2022, the Dodgers currently lead the rivalry 509–415, on top of a postseason series victory.

History

1960s
The first meeting between the two teams occurred during the seventh game of the 1969 season at Dodger Stadium on April 15, 1969. In the beginning, it seemed like it could be a pitchers’ duel. With Johnny Podres on the mound for the Padres, facing his old team in what would be his final season in the majors, and Claude Osteen for the Dodgers, the first four innings passed so quickly and uneventfully that you could have blinked and missed them. But then the bottom of the fifth hit, and things fell apart. A groundout gave way to a walk, three consecutive singles, and yet another walk, before Andy Kosco hit a grand slam that put the Dodgers ahead 6-0. Afterwards, Osteen limited the Padres to only three hits, the Dodger lineup piled eight more runs with the final score being 14-0. It was the Padres’ fourth consecutive loss after beginning their existence with a sweep of the Houston Astros before getting swept by the San Francisco Giants. The next day, they piled another nine runs on the Padres, who were only able to muster up a lone run in response. The Padres would go on to finish their inaugural season with a 52-110 record, and it would be nearly a decade before they would manage a winning season.

1970s
Luck would begin to shift near the end of the 1970s for the Padres as they managed their first winning season in 1978, though they failed to qualify for the postseason as the Dodgers managed to win the division en route to a World Series appearance. Despite the lone winning season in 1978, the Padres would only ever manage two seasons at .500 in 1982 and 1983 while the Dodgers managed three World Series appearances during the 1970s, in 1974. 1977, and 1978; though they would lose all 3 to end the decade.

1980s
The Padres managed to break through with an appearance in their first World Series in 1984, but they would fall to the Detroit Tigers in 5 games. The Dodgers meanwhile managed to win a pair of championships in 1981 and 1988.

1990s
The Dodgers teams soon waned in competition through the 1990s as they would only go on to win the division in 1994 and 1995. In 1995, the Dodgers managed to make an appearance in the NLDS but were swept by the Reds. Meanwhile, the fortunes had alternated in favor of the Padres during the 1996 season that saw them make a thorough push to the NLDS but they too fell short by a sweep of their own against the St. Louis Cardinals. The Padres would go on to make yet another push through to the World Series in 1998, but would not overcome the New York Yankees as they would go onto fall in a humiliating sweep.

2000s
The 2000s proved to be a severely problematic decade for both franchises, as the Dodgers managed to win the division 3 times but were defeated by the Philadelphia Phillies in the NLCS both times in 2008 and 2009. The Frank Mccourt led ownership proved to be largely flawed as the Dodgers often boasted immensely talented rosters but constantly fell short of a World Series appearance throughout the decade until Mccourt's forced sale of the team in 2011. The Padres would manage back-to-back division wins in 2005 and 2006 but fell to the St. Louis Cardinals both times in the NLDS, failing to repeat an appearance in the World Series for themselves since 1998. Notably, the two teams were the only two teams to play spring training in China as a part of the MLB China Series in 2008. The Dodgers would later go on to boast a 7-year stretch at the lead of the NL West division from 2013 to 2020 while the Padres failed to make the postseason from 2006 to 2020.

2010s
In 2016, both teams met for the league season opener matchup, both teams began the season with new managers at the helm including Dave Roberts, the former Padres manager who had signed with the Dodgers during the offseason. However, as the Dodgers had rebounded to a more competitive form, the Padres did not. What resulted was the largest loss per any season opener in league history. The Dodgers would go onto destroy the Padres 15-0 as they were no match for Clayton Kershaw locking up nearly all their hitters within the first 7 innings. The Dodgers would make two World Series appearances in 2017 and 2018, but fell in both to the Houston Astros and the Boston Red Sox respectively.

2020s
The 2020 season was limited to 60 games due to the COVID-19 pandemic.  The Dodgers won the division title while the Padres finished in second. The two teams met in the Division Series which was played in Arlington, Texas due to COVID-19 contingencies.

Game 1 saw Mike Clevinger return to the mound for the Padres but was pulled after one inning after a noticeable drop in velocity. The game remained scoreless until the fourth inning, when the Padres scored on a two-out hit from Austin Nola. San Diego enjoyed their lead briefly – until the Dodgers scored on an error in the fifth. Then a game that had been well-pitched to that point boiled over in the sixth, when the Dodgers put up four runs to win, 5–1 score. Just like Game 3 of their wild card win over the Cardinals, the Padres used nine pitchers and walked ten batters, along the way. The Padres took an early lead in the second inning when Wil Myers hit a double to center field that scored Tommy Pham. The Dodgers took the lead for good in the third inning on a two-run double by Corey Seager and a single by Max Muncy, and padded their lead the next inning on a Cody Bellinger home run. The Padres began the sixth inning with back-to-back home runs by Manny Machado and Eric Hosmer that reduced their deficit to one, but Dodgers starter Clayton Kershaw retired the next three batters to end the inning. The Padres threatened again in the seventh inning, when Bellinger made a spectacular catch over the center-field wall that would otherwise have been a go-ahead two-run home run by Fernando Tatís Jr. The Dodgers padded their lead in the bottom of the seventh on a Justin Turner sacrifice fly and a single by Muncy. The Padres threatened in the top of the ninth inning, scoring two runs and once again reducing their deficit to one and load the bases, however. Joe Kelly got Hosmer to ground out to end the game.
Game 3 quickly saw the Dodgers take an early lead in the second inning that was quickly erased when the Padres scored two runs in the bottom half of the inning. The Padres' lead was also short-lived, as the Dodgers scored five runs in the third inning en route to a blowout win. Though he did not start the game, erstwhile Dodgers starter Julio Urías pitched five innings in relief, allowing one run on one hit, striking out six Padres, and getting credited as the winning pitcher. The Padres, meanwhile, used 11 pitchers – a postseason record for a nine-inning game. The Dodgers advanced to their fourth NLCS in five seasons, ultimately winning the World Series

After trading for Yu Darvish, Joe Musgrove and Blake Snell in the off-season, the Padres looked like their fortunes would continue to reverse during the  season, but the San Francisco Giants managed an unexpected push to win the division with the Dodgers finishing in second.  The Padres only managed a 79-83 record; missing the postseason. After the season, Padres manager Jayce Tingler was fired and was replaced by long-time Oakland A's manager Bob Melvin.  At the 2022 trade deadline, the Padres acquired Juan Soto, Josh Bell, Brandon Drury, and Josh Hader, going all-in to beat the Dodgers and win their first World Series. Padres owner Peter Seidler described the situation as such. "They're the dragon up the freeway that we're trying to slay," Seidler said during an in-game interview on ESPN's Sunday Night Baseball when describing the Dodgers-Padres dynamic. The Dodgers finished 2022 going 14-5 against San Diego, not dropping a single series against the Padres. Things grew worse for San Diego as Fernando Tatis Jr. (who was gearing up for make his debut on the season from an off-season injury to his shoulder) was suspended for 80 games on August 12 after testing positive for Clostebal; a banned steroid. On top of leading the series through the 2022 season, the Dodgers led the league with 111 wins, winning the division in the process. The Padres rebounded towards the end of the season and earned a wild card spot, where they defeated the New York Mets 2–1 in the Wild Card Series. The Dodgers and Padres played each other in the 2022 National League Division Series. During Game 2, a goose ran onto the field of Dodger Stadium, with both fanbases claiming it as a rally goose and a curse for their team. The Padres won the series 3–1 in an upset over the Dodgers, whose 111 wins in the regular season were the fourth most in MLB history and 22 more than San Diego's 89. The only time in league playoff history that a team defeated an opponent who was more than 22 wins better was in the 1906 World Series, when the 93-win Chicago White Sox defeated the 116-win Chicago Cubs. The win advanced San Diego to their first NLCS since 1998.

Connections between the teams

Postseason series
The first postseason matchup between the two teams occurred during the 2020 National League Division Series at Globe Life Field in Arlington, Texas as a part of the playoff bubble due to the COVID-19 Pandemic. The series saw the Dodgers sweep the Padres 3–0.

The second postseason matchup between the two teams occurred during the 2022 National League Division Series with the Padres winning once at Dodgers Stadium and twice at Petco to defeat the Dodgers 3-1.

See also
 Freeway Series
 Dodgers–Giants rivalry
 Bay Bridge Series
 Phillies–Pirates rivalry
 Chargers–Raiders rivalry
 Lakers–Clippers rivalry

References
Inline citations

Los Angeles Dodgers
San Diego Padres
Major League Baseball rivalries